Kyle MacKinnon (born October 28, 1987) is an American professional ice hockey player. He is currently an unrestricted free agent who most recently played with the Straubing Tigers of the Deutsche Eishockey Liga (DEL).

Playing career
MacKinnon attended Providence College where he played four seasons (2007-2011) of college hockey with the NCAA Division I Providence Friars men's ice hockey team, scoring 70 points and registering 79 penalty minutes in 137 career games. He

MacKinnon made his professional debut during the 2010–11 season playing in the American Hockey League with the Providence Bruins.

After solidifying his career in the AHL in two seasons with the St. John's IceCaps, MacKinnon signed as a free agent on a two-year contract with his third AHL club, the San Diego Gulls on July 8, 2015.

MacKinnon's tenure with the Gulls was largely interrupted through injury, limiting him to just 32 games over two seasons. On June 7, 2017, MacKinnon left the AHL as a free agent and signed his first contract abroad with German club, Straubing Tigers of the Deutsche Eishockey Liga (DEL), on a one-year agreement.

Career statistics

References

External links

1987 births
American men's ice hockey centers
Chilliwack Chiefs players
Living people
Providence Bruins players
Providence Friars men's ice hockey players
Reading Royals players
San Diego Gulls (AHL) players
St. John's IceCaps players
Straubing Tigers players